A wave-dissipating concrete block is a naturally or manually interlocking concrete structure designed and employed to minimize the effects of wave action upon shores and shoreline structures, such as quays and jettys.

Examples include such proprietary designs as the Tetrapod, Accropode, Xbloc, KOLOS, and Dolos.

See also